WKAN (1320 AM) is a radio station broadcasting a Talk/Personality format. Licensed to Kankakee, Illinois, United States.  The station is currently owned by STARadio Corporation and features programming from Fox News Radio, Premiere Networks and Westwood One.

FM Translator
In addition to the main station at 1320 kHz, WKAN is relayed by an FM translator which provides improved sound and  coverage.

Programming
WKAN broadcasts a local morning show, The Morning Roundtable hosted by Joshua Carman, weekdays 7-9am.  Another local show is the Ron Jackson Show, which airs Saturdays 11am-Noon.  WKAN also broadcasts several network shows such as Glenn Beck, Dave Ramsey, Sean Hannity, Mark Levin, and Jim Bohannon.  Local news is covered by Jared Cerullo.  Other news is provided by Fox News Radio and Illinois News Network.

References

External links

KAN